Regional elections were held in Denmark on 12 March 1946. 11488 municipal council members were elected, as well as 299 members of the amts of Denmark.

Results
The results of the regional elections:

Amt Councils

Municipal Councils

References

1946
Denmark
Elections
March 1946 events in Europe